Digify Inc. is a subsidiary of GMA New Media founded in 2011, which specializes stand-alone digital and integrated marketing campaigns for mobile, web, and broadcast applications.

Digify holds several key accounts, including SM Prime Holdings, Inc., which commissioned the company to develop its SM Supermalls iOS and Android mobile apps. Digify is also a partner of Samsung Electronics Philippines Corporation (SEPCO) as it powered all the interactive displays in SEPCO-sponsored museum exhibits, including Yuchengco Museum's Relative Realities exhibit.

Its headquarters are located at the GMA Network Center in Quezon City, Philippines. In July 2014, Digify mobile app gained local and international recognition

Products and services
Products and services offered by Digify include augmented reality for mobile, desktop and kiosks; mobile app design and development for iOS and Android; game design and development; audio-visual production services; web design and development (HTML5); Facebook app design and development; mobile-related services (SMS Promos, etc.); customized QR services; location-based services; online display ad production; and projection-mapping services.

Mobile applications
 Almost Real
 AR Scanner - Augmented Reality
 AR Scanner for Mini Devices
 Del Monte Kitchenomics 
 Culture Explorer (Philippines)
 FACETS 
 SM Supermalls  Video AR - Augmented Reality Video AR for Mini DevicesDefunct
 Cash n' Dash''

Accolades

References

GMA Network (company) subsidiaries
Mass media companies of the Philippines
Philippine companies established in 2000
Companies based in Quezon City
Mass media companies established in 2000